The 1816 New Hampshire gubernatorial election was held on March 12, 1816.

Incumbent Federalist Governor John Taylor Gilman did not run for re-election.

Democratic-Republican nominee William Plumer 
defeated Federalist nominee James Sheafe.

General election

Candidates
William Plumer, Democratic-Republican, former Governor
James Sheafe, Federalist, former U.S. Senator

Results

References

1816
New Hampshire
Gubernatorial